Vladimir Lukov (Bulgarian: Владимир Луков; born June 2, 1949) is a Bulgarian poet. He is a descendant of the repatriated family Tsipas Greek Macedonia, Agios Pandeleimon near Florina. He graduated with the specialties of Geography and Philosophy from Sofia University “St. Kliment Ohridski”. Since 1969 he has published poetry. His poems have been released in many Bulgarian and Macedonian literary magazines and anthologies. He has written the books “The man with prostheses”(1992), “The scout”(1993), “Ungodly incarnations” (1999), “A gorge” (2001), “ Checking of the senses” (2005), “Providence” (Skopie, 2006 library Balkan writers), “Traces of wind” (2007) and "Fibres of infinity"(2011). Bulgarian literary criticism defines Vladimir Lukov’s poetry as philosophical and enigmatic. The poet is a member of the Union of the free writers in Bulgaria.

External links 
 http://svobodenpisatel.org/member.php?id=5
 http://liternet.bg/publish14/v_lukov/index.html
 http://knigi-news.com/?in=pod&stat=6656&section=9&cur=

20th-century Bulgarian poets
21st-century Bulgarian poets
Bulgarian male poets
Living people
1949 births
People from Rousse Province